Bidasar may refer to:

 Bidasar, Churu, a city and a municipality in Churu district in the state of Rajasthan, India
 Bidasar, Sikar, a village in the Laxmangarh administrative region of Sikar district of Rajasthan, India
 Bidasar marble, a natural stone marble found in Rajasthan, India

See also
 Bidasari (disambiguation)